Eutrepsia is a genus of moths in the family Geometridae first described by Gottlieb August Wilhelm Herrich-Schäffer in 1855.

Species
Eutrepsia inconstans (Geyer, 1837) Mexico
Eutrepsia lithosiata (Guenée, 1857) probably Brazil
Eutrepsia dispar (Walker, 1854) Mexico, Honduras, Guatemala, Nicaragua
Eutrepsia striatus (H. Druce, 1885) Guatemala
Eutrepsia secreta (Walker, [1865]) Mexico, Guatemala
Eutrepsia pacilius (H. Druce, 1885) Guatemala
Eutrepsia primulina (Butler & H. Druce, 1872) Costa Rica

References

Geometridae